María Irigoyen and Paula Kania were the defending champions, but both players chose not to participate.

Arina Rodionova and Valeriya Strakhova won the title, defeating Irina Khromacheva and İpek Soylu in the final, 6–1, 6–2.

Seeds

Draw

References 
 Draw

Nana Trophy - Doubles